Nelson Bengston (August 29, 1905 – December 4, 1986) was an American businessman whose political views and actions in the civil rights movement landed him on the master list of Nixon political opponents. He was president of Bengston & Co., and a member of Business Executives Move for Vietnam Peace. He was also Treasurer of Amnesty International USA and member of the NAACP and several other progressive organizations. He worked for the Treasury selling War Bonds during World War II, and was Finance Director of Sidney Hillman's National Citizens Political Action Committee during the 1944 presidential election campaign.

References
Staff report (June 28, 1973). Lists of White House 'Enemies' and Memorandums Relating to Those Named. New York Times
Papers of the NAACP: Special Subject Files, 1966-1970. Part 28, series A 0814 Leagues and Organizations. International League for the Rights of Man, 1967–1969. (PDF) 27 pp. Principal Correspondents: John A. Morsell; Nelson Bengston; Jan Papanek; Roger Nash Baldwin; Roy Wilkins.

External links 

Records of the Watergate Special Prosecution Force 1971 to 1977 via National Archives and Records Administration

1905 births
1986 deaths

20th-century American businesspeople